Swanson railway station is a station on the North Auckland Line in Auckland, New Zealand.

Western Line services of the Auckland rail network are operated between the station and Britomart in central Auckland by Auckland One Rail, on behalf of Auckland Transport.

The station is the westernmost and northernmost point of the city's electrified network. It became the terminus of the Western Line in July 2015, when urban train services to Waitakere station ceased because the Waitakere-Swanson section of track was not electrified. A bus shuttle service operates between Waitakere and Swanson stations.

The current station building was relocated from Avondale railway station following an upgrade there.

History
 1881: The station opened on 18 July.
 1920: A signal box was built.
 1925: Signal box destroyed by fire following a lightning strike.
 1970: Signal box was removed.
 1972: Closed to goods.
 1972: Buildings replaced by a platform shelter (on opposite side to present station).
 1995: Avondale railway station building was relocated here, now Swanson Station Cafe. The Avondale station had been planned for demolition due to its poor state, however after hearing this, Waitakere Community Board members Dave Harré and Penny Hulse lobbied New Zealand Rail to save and refurbish the building.
 2000: New platform on the east side of the tracks.
 2008: New platform on the west side of the tracks; the east side platform will be re-established to provide platforms on each side of the new double track.
 2011: Electrification works started.
 2014: Electrification works completed, and station energised.

See also 
 List of Auckland railway stations

References

External links

Rail transport in Auckland
Railway stations in New Zealand
Railway stations opened in 1881
Waitākere Ranges Local Board Area
1881 establishments in New Zealand
Buildings and structures in Auckland
West Auckland, New Zealand